Dieglman Island is an island about  long that is largely ice covered but has numerous rock outcrops, lying on the northwest side of Edisto Channel in the Highjump Archipelago. First mapped from air photos taken by U.S. Navy Operation Highjump, 1946–47, and named the "Dieglman Islets", subsequent Soviet expeditions (1956–57) mapped the feature as one island with numerous outcrops. The name has been altered by the Advisory Committee on Antarctic Names (US-ACAN) to apply to the single island. Named by US-ACAN for E.D. Dieglman, an air crewman on U.S. Navy Operation Highjump photographic flights in this area in 1946–47.

See also 
 List of antarctic and sub-antarctic islands

References 

Islands of Wilkes Land